Colin Maritz (14 March 1892 – 1 October 1966) was a South African cricketer. He played in sixteen first-class matches between 1910/11 and 1933/34.

See also
 List of Eastern Province representative cricketers

References

External links
 

1892 births
1966 deaths
South African cricketers
Eastern Province cricketers
Griqualand West cricketers
Free State cricketers
Gauteng cricketers